Imagine is a 1976 French-language chanson album by Mort Shuman with band conducted by Hervé Roy. The album earned a gold record in France. Three singles were released from the album; "Sorrow" (B: "Botany Bay"), "Save The Last Dance For Me (B: "Papa-Tango-Charly") and "Imagine" (B: "Dansons").

Track listing 

 A-side 
 Imagine – music Shuman lyrics Moro
 Papa-Tango-Charly (Le Triangle Des Bermudes) – lyrics Philippe Adler
 A Chaque Coeur Sa Raison
 Sorrow

 B-side
 Save The Last Dance For Me – lyrics André Salvet, François Llenas
 Le Vieux Broadway
 Dansons – E. L. Moro, M. Shuman
 Devant Ton Berceau
 La Vieille Demoiselle

References

1976 albums
Mort Shuman albums